STI Knives is a tactical knife company based in Moissac, France. The president and CEO is Jeff Thenier, who designs the tactical products including knives, Impact Tools, and other edged weapons.  STI Knives are different from other tactical knives because they are modeled after the hand gun, using pistol bayonet type techniques for combat, these tactical folding knives have multiple locking positions making them able to mimic characteristics of various other weapons.

Jeff Thenier
Jeff Thenier is the president and CEO of STI Knives. He has been training body guards for 20 years. State certified teacher in martial arts and combat sports. Shooting Instructor, Police Science Instructor, Tonfa and Baton Instructor, Bodyguard, Knifemaker and Technical Director of DOJO KMI. Jeff Thenier created the concept design for the P001 Knife for high security professionals as an alternative to the firearm.

Concept
STI Knives have a unique pistol shape design, so that the professional who uses the hand gun as their primary weapon would be more efficient and effective when forced to use their secondary weapon, the knife. These knives were designed to be used when the user wasn't allowed to or able to use their firearm. The STI knives were shaped after a pistol, but also have many characteristics of other weapons such as the Tonfa, Tomahawk, Boomerang, Brass Knuckles, Yawara Stick, Straight Razor, Karambit, and Pistol Bayonet.  The knives are designed for various circumstances like emergency rescues, or martial arts training.

Products
Many of the common responses to the products are; "Knives with the appearance of a firearm"
The BODYGUARD P001 is a pistol shaped tactical folding knife, it has 3 locking positions and it took 4 years in the making. It features capabilities of lethal and non lethal, emergency rescue, and characteristics of martial arts weapons including, Pistol Bayonet, Standard Knife, Tonfa, Straight Razor, Karambit knife, Sai, Kubotan, Brass Knuckles, Tomahawk, Boomerang.

The BG911 is a compact version of the P001. The TDZ7 is the pistol shaped non lethal Impact Tool made of hard plastic, it is used like a large Yawara Stick, there are 5 different colors to signify your skill level, black, yellow green, red, and blue. The Tai Sabaki is marketed as their best knife, unlike the combat weapon looking P001, this tactical folding knife is shaped like a sleek utility folding knife, and it features 6 locking positions with 13 grip positions, designed for EDC (Every Day Carry), self-defense on the street.

References

External links
http://www.combtact.com/

Knife manufacturing companies